Soloneț may refer to several places in Romania:

 Soloneț, a village in Bivolari Commune, Iași County
 Soloneț, a village in Todirești Commune, Suceava County
 Solonețu Nou, a village in Cacica Commune, Suceava County
 Soloneț (Prut), a tributary of the Prut in Iași County, Romania
 Soloneț (Suceava), a tributary of the Suceava in Suceava County, Romania

and a village in Moldova:
 Soloneț, a village in Stoicani Commune, Soroca district